Upper Hamble Estuary and Woods is a  biological Site of Special Scientific Interest east of Southampton in Hampshire. It is part of Solent and Southampton Water Ramsar site and  Special Protection Area, and of Solent Maritime Special Area of Conservation. Part of the site is in Manor Farm Country Park, which is a Local Nature Reserve.

This site comprises the upper estuary of the River Hamble, together with adjoining saltmarsh, reedswamp and ancient semi-natural woodland. The woods have a diverse ground flora and invertebrate fauna. There is also a narrow zone of mudflats, with large numbers of marine worms, crustaceans and molluscs, which provide food for birds.

References

 
Sites of Special Scientific Interest in Hampshire
Ramsar sites in England
Special Areas of Conservation in England
Special Protection Areas in England